"Pump That Body" is the first single from the album Healing, released by freestyle music singer Stevie B in 1992. The song achieved limited success, managing to break into the best-selling dance singles chart, peaking at No. 15. In Canada, the song spent only two weeks on the dance music chart, reaching No. 6.

Track listing
12 "/ CD Single

Charts

References

1992 singles
Stevie B songs
1992 songs